Fobia on Ice was a live album released by Fobia, a Mexican rock band on December 16, 1997. After Fobia's first live album, band members Leonardo de Lozanne, Paco Huidobro, Cha!, and Iñaki,Jay de la Cueva, would part ways without formally breaking up until recording together again in 2004.

The band
 Paco Huidobro: Guitars, chorus
 Leonardo de Lozanne: Vocals, chorus
 Iñaki: Keyboards
 Cha!: Bass
 Jay de la Cueva: Drums

Track listing
 El microbito (The little microbe, from Fobia)
 Veneno vil (Vile poison, from Amor Chiquito)
 Fiebre (Fever, from Leche)
 El diablo (The devil, from Mundo Feliz)
 Camila (Camila, from Mundo Feliz)
 Regrésame a Júpiter (Take me back to Jupiter, from Leche)
 Descontrol (Descontrol, from Amor Chiquito)
 Puedo rascarme solo (I can scratch myself, from Fobia)
 Dios bendiga a los gusanos (God bless the worms, from Fobia)
 Los cibernoides (The cibernoids, from Leche)
 Mira Teté (Mientras más fumo más te quiero) (Look Teté (the more I smoke, the more I love you), from Amor Chiquito)
 Perra policía (Bitch police, from Leche)
 Revolución sin manos (Revolution without hands, from Amor Chiquito)
 El crucifijo (The crucifix, from Fobia)
 Hipnotízame (Hypnotize me, from Amor Chiquito)
 Vivo (Alive, from Amor Chiquito)

Fobia albums
1997 live albums